Petar Pankov (born 20 April 1945) is a Bulgarian cross-country skier. He competed at the 1968 Winter Olympics, the 1972 Winter Olympics and the 1976 Winter Olympics.

References

External links
 

1945 births
Living people
Bulgarian male cross-country skiers
Olympic cross-country skiers of Bulgaria
Cross-country skiers at the 1968 Winter Olympics
Cross-country skiers at the 1972 Winter Olympics
Cross-country skiers at the 1976 Winter Olympics
Sportspeople from Sofia